Ruatokansan Uamunkoetto ("Dawn of the Dead") is the second album by Savo band Verjnuarmu.

Track listing

 Tulesta Pimmeyven ('From the Fire of Darkness') - 3:47
 Kuu Paestaa, Kuollu Ajjaa ('Moon Shines, The Dead Rides') - 4:47
 Mustan Virran Silta ('Bridge of Black River') - 3:48
 Luita Ja Hampaeta ('Bones and Teeth') - 3:00
 Surmatun Säkkeet ('Phrases of the Slain') - 4:25
 Huaskalinnut ('Vultures') - 4:31
 Kuhtumattomat Vieraat ('Uninvited Guests') - 5:01
 Kirkkomuan Kansoo ('People of the Churchground') - 4:11
 Räähähenki ('Poltergeist') - 3:16
 Kalamavesj' ('Deadly Water') - 5:07

Chart positions

Ruatokansan Uamunkoetto reached the #24 spot at its peak on the Finnish Albums Top 40 charts and was there for a week.

Personnel
Puijon Perkele - lead vocals
Savon Surma - rhythm guitar, lead vocals
Viitakemies - lead guitar, backing vocals
Woema - bass guitar
Musta Savo - drums, lead and backing vocals

Production
Tero Holopainen - recording, mixing, and producing
Kimmo Hämäläinen - mixing
Dragan Tanaskovic - mastering
Tarmo Luostarinen - artwork

References

2008 albums
Verjnuarmu albums